Vladislavs Gutkovskis (born 2 April 1995) is a Latvian professional footballer who plays as a forward for Raków Częstochowa and the Latvia national team.

Club career
Gutkovskis started his career with JFK Olimps.

International career
Gutkovskis got his first call up to the senior Latvia side for 2018 FIFA World Cup qualifiers against Faroe Islands and Hungary in October 2016.

Career statistics

Club

International
Scores and results list Latvia's goal tally first, score column indicates score after each Gutkovskis goal.

Honours

Club
Skonto FC
 Latvian Football Cup runner-up: 2013–14
 Latvian Supercup runner-up: 2013

Raków Częstochowa
 Polish Cup: 2020–21, 2021–22
 Polish Super Cup: 2022

Individual
 Latvian Footballer of the Year: 2021, 2022
 Polish Cup top scorer: 2020–21

References

External links 
 
 

Living people
1995 births
Association football forwards
Latvian footballers
Latvia international footballers
Latvian Higher League players
Ekstraklasa players
I liga players
JFK Olimps players
Skonto FC players
Bruk-Bet Termalica Nieciecza players
Raków Częstochowa players
Latvian expatriate footballers
Expatriate footballers in Poland
Latvian expatriate sportspeople in Poland
Latvia youth international footballers
Latvia under-21 international footballers
Footballers from Riga